American Fork may refer to:

 American Fork, Utah, a city in the US
 American Fork (UTA station), Utah Transit Authority commuter rail station
 American Fork (river), a river that flows through the city
 American Fork Canyon, through which the river flows